Havana Hopman (born 16 October 2003) is a New Zealand rhythmic gymnast. She represents her country in international competitions.

Personal life 
Havana began rhythmic gymnastics at age seven after a swimming coach told her parents that her flexible feet would make her a good ballet dancer and gymnast. Her ballet teacher later encouraged her to practise rhythmic gymnastics. Her dream is to compete at the 2024 Olympic Games in Paris. Her idol is New Zealand athlete Portia Bing. Outside the sporting hall her hobbies are spending time with family and friends, walking her dogs, baking. In 2021 she began studying for a degree in health sciences at the University of Auckland. She fell ill with a viral chest infection on her competition day at the 2022 World Cup event in Sofia, she was able to compete at the event, but was later hospitalised in Bulgaria.

Career 
Hopman debuted internationally at the 2022 World Cup in Sofia, ending 31st in the All-Around, 24th with hoop, 27th with ball, 35th with clubs and 25th with ribbon. After she recovered competed in Tashkent taking 16th place in the All-Around, 18th with hoop, 14th with ball, 17th with clubs and 16th with ribbon. And then in Baku  being 29th in the All-Around, 31st with hoop, 34th with ball, 24th with clubs and 29th with ribbon. At the end of May she took part in the Oceania Championships in Carrara, she was 4th with hoop and ball and won bronze with clubs and ribbon. In August Havana was selected for the Commonwealth Games in Birmingham, ending 9th in the All-Around, 4th in the clubs final. She ended her year competing at the World Championships in Sofia, being 53rd in the All-Around, 72nd with hoop, 62nd with ball, 49th with clubs and 48th with ribbon.

References 

2003 births
Living people
New Zealand rhythmic gymnasts
People from Auckland
Gymnasts at the 2022 Commonwealth Games